Sant Andreu de la Barca is a municipality in the comarca of the Baix Llobregat in Catalonia, Spain. It is situated on the right bank of the Llobregat river, on the main N-II road The main rail lines of the Llobregat corridor pass through the town, and all the 
FGC suburban services stop at the station.

Demography

References

 Panareda Clopés, Josep Maria; Rios Calvet, Jaume; Rabella Vives, Josep Maria (1989). Guia de Catalunya, Barcelona: Caixa de Catalunya.  (Spanish).  (Catalan).

External links
 Government data pages 

Municipalities in Baix Llobregat